María José Llorca (born 3 March 1970) is a former professional tennis player from Spain.

Biography
Llorca is originally from Valencia and was trained in Barcelona as a junior.

A a right-handed player, she appeared in a total of four Federation Cup ties for Spain, the first two in 1986 when she was still only 16. In 1987 she featured in another two ties, including a World Group second round fixture against Australia which they lost, despite Llorca winning the opening rubber against Anne Minter.

From 1987 to 1991 she competed on the WTA Tour. She and Anna-Karin Olsson were runners-up in the doubles at the 1988 Spanish Open, which included a win over top seeds Bettina Fulco and Arantxa Sanchez Vicario.

Both of her grand slam main draw appearances came at the 1988 French Open, where she featured in the main draw of the women's doubles and mixed doubles, partnering Alison Scott and Jordi Arrese respectively.

In 2003 she took up the sport of padel tennis and was ranked as high as two in the world, before retiring in 2009.

WTA Tour finals

Doubles (0–1)

ITF finals

Singles: 6 (3-3)

Doubles: 5 (4–1)

See also
List of Spain Fed Cup team representatives

References

External links
 
 
 

1970 births
Living people
Spanish female tennis players
Tennis players from the Valencian Community
Paddle tennis players